Neurocossus speideli is a moth in the family Cossidae. It is found on Peninsular Malaysia, Sumatra and Borneo.

The wingspan is 15–16 mm.

References

Natural History Museum Lepidoptera generic names catalog

Cossinae